The Journal of Proteome Research is a peer-reviewed scientific journal published since 2002 by the American Chemical Society. Its publication frequency switched from bimonthly to monthly in 2006. The current editor-in-chief is John R. Yates.

Abstracting and indexing 
The journal is abstracted and indexed in EBSCOhost, PubMed, Scopus, and the Web of Science. In 2013, J. Proteome Res. had an impact factor of 5.001 as reported in the 2013 Journal Citation Reports by Thomson Reuters, ranking it 10th out of 75 journals in the category “Biochemical Research Methods”. The impact factor in 2015 was 4.173.

Google scholar lists the journal as 2nd in the category "Proteomics, Peptides & Aminoacids"  with an h5-index of 67. The most cited papers in the last 5 years are "Andromeda: A Peptide Search Engine Integrated into the MaxQuant Environment" (Cox et al., 2011), "More than 100,000 Detectable Peptide Species Elute in Single Shotgun Proteomics Runs but the Majority is Inaccessible to Data-Dependent LC− MS/MS" (Michalski et al., 2011) and "Universal and Confident Phosphorylation Site Localization Using phosphoRS" (Taus et al., 2011).

References

External links 
 

American Chemical Society academic journals
Bimonthly journals
English-language journals
Publications established in 2002
Proteomics journals